The men's 4 x 100 metres relay at the 1946 European Athletics Championships was held in Oslo, Norway, at Bislett Stadion on 24 and 25 August 1946.

Medalists

Results

Final
25 August

Heats
24 August

Heat 1

Heat 2

Participation
According to an unofficial count, 36 athletes from 9 countries participated in the event.

 (4)
 (4)
 (4)
 (4)
 (4)
 (4)
 (4)
 (4)
 (4)

References

4 x 100 metres relay
Relays at the European Athletics Championships